Shalili-ye Bozorg (also Romanized as Shalīlī-ye Bozorg; also known as Shahaili, Shalīli, and Shalīlī-ye Bālā) is a village in Miyan Ab-e Shomali Rural District, in the Central District of Shushtar County, Khuzestan Province, Iran. At the 2006 census, its population was 882, in 167 families.

References 

Populated places in Shushtar County